Vasilios Triantafyllakis (born 2 June 1998) is a Greek professional footballer who plays as a midfielder for Super League 2 club Kalamata.

Honours
Digenis Akritas Morphou
Cypriot Third Division: 2018–19
Cypriot Cup for lower divisions: 2018–19

References

1998 births
Living people
Greek footballers
Greek expatriate footballers
Expatriate footballers in England
Greek expatriate sportspeople in England
Cypriot Second Division players
Football League (Greece) players
Digenis Akritas Morphou FC players
PAEEK players
Kalamata F.C. players
Association football midfielders
Footballers from Kalamata